Yanzhuang Subdistrict is a subdistrict of Guan County in northwestern Shandong province, China. , it has 34 villages under its administration.

See also 
 List of township-level divisions of Shandong

References 

Township-level divisions of Shandong